Referendum K was a referendum on the 2006 Colorado ballot.  It "directs the Colorado attorney general to initiate, or join other states in, a lawsuit against the U.S. attorney general to demand that the federal government enforce existing federal immigration laws".1 The referendum passed, garnering 55.72% of the vote.

See also
 List of Colorado ballot measures

References

External links
 Colorado Legislative Council ballot analysis

2006 Colorado ballot measures